Artic Computing was a software development company based in Brandesburton, England from 1980 to 1986. The company's first games were for the Sinclair ZX81 home computer, but they expanded and were also responsible for various ZX Spectrum, Commodore 64, BBC Micro, Acorn Electron and Amstrad CPC computer games. The company was set up by Richard Turner and Chris Thornton. Charles Cecil, who later founded Revolution Software, joined the company shortly after it was founded, writing Adventures B through D. Developer Jon Ritman produced a number of ZX81 and Spectrum games for Artic before moving to Ocean Software.

Usually packaging and distributing games themselves, some titles were picked up by Sinclair who repackaged them under the Sinclair brand, and Amstrad who repackaged them under their Amsoft brand.

Adventures A through D were written for the ZX81 but were quickly ported to the ZX Spectrum platform on its release (as well as other systems). By comparison with later Spectrum adventure games such as The Hobbit, they are basic and short. However they are considered by many to be the start of the adventure game genre on the Spectrum in particular and thus were an important step in the growth of adventure games.

Games
Sword of Peace (1980): ZX80, ZX81
Adventure A: Planet of Death (1981): ZX81, ZX Spectrum, C64, Amstrad CPC
Adventure B: Inca Curse (1981): ZX81, ZX Spectrum, C64, Amstrad CPC
Zombies (1981): ZX81
ZX Chess (1981): ZX81
1K ZX Chess (1982): ZX81
Adventure C: Ship of Doom (1982): ZX81, ZX Spectrum, C64, Amstrad CPC
Adventure D: Espionage Island (1982): ZX81, ZX Spectrum, C64, Amstrad CPC
Invaders (1982): ZX Spectrum
Namtir Raiders (1982): ZX81
ZX-Galaxians (1982): ZX81
3D Combat Zone (1983): ZX Spectrum
Adventure E: The Golden Apple (1983): ZX Spectrum
Bear Bovver (1983): ZX Spectrum, C64
Cosmic Debris (1983): ZX Spectrum
Dimension Destructors (1983): ZX Spectrum
Adventure F: The Eye of Bain (1984): ZX Spectrum
Adventure G: Ground Zero (1984): ZX Spectrum
Engineer Humpty (1984): ZX Spectrum, C64
Humpty Dumpty in the Garden (1984): ZX Spectrum, C64
Humpty Dumpty Meets the Fuzzy Wuzzies (1984): ZX Spectrum, C64
Mothership (1984): ZX Spectrum, C64
Mr Wong's Loopy Laundry (1984): ZX Spectrum, C64, Amstrad CPC, MSX
Mutant Monty (1984): ZX Spectrum, C64, Amstrad CPC
World Cup Football (1984): ZX Spectrum, C64, Amstrad CPC (reworked as World Cup Carnival by U.S. Gold in 1986)
Adventure H: Robin Hood (1985): ZX Spectrum (released only as part of the Assemblage compilation)
Aladdin's Cave (1985): ZX Spectrum, Amstrad CPC
International Rugby (1985): ZX Spectrum, Amstrad CPC
Obsidian (1986): Amstrad CPC
Paws (1985): ZX Spectrum, Amstrad CPC
Web War (1985): Acorn Electron, BBC Micro; similar to Tempest
Rugby Manager (1986): ZX Spectrum
The Great Wall  (1986): Acorn Electron, BBC Micro; similar to Hunchback
Voodoo Rage (1986): Amstrad CPC
Woks (1986): Acorn Electron, BBC Micro

Adventure Games Development
The parser in their adventures is of a basic 2-word design, such as "Use Axe". However the programs from adventures A-F were built using a custom built design.  Adventure G (Ground Zero) and later were built using The Quill, an Adventure Game Creator produced by Gilsoft.

Programming
 Artic Forth (1982) [forth programming language]

References

External links 
 Artic Computing at Adventureland

Defunct video game companies of the United Kingdom